Jennifer Douglas (b. 1974) is a Canadian archivist and academic who researches the creation of personal archives and their place within with traditional archival practice.

Career
Douglas was born in Mississauga, Ontario in 1974 and was raised in Alberta and British Columbia. She obtained a B.A. and M.A. in English literature from the University of Victoria. Douglas' Ph.D. thesis "Archiving Authors: Rethinking the Analysis and Representation of Personal Archives" was completed in 2013 at the University of Toronto under the supervision of Heather MacNeil. The thesis was awarded the iSchool's Dissertation Award.

Douglas joined UBC School of Library, Archival and Information Studies as an associate professor in 2016. She has served on editorial team of Archivaria, including the role of general editor since 2014. In 2020 she was announced as UCLA's 2021 Kenneth Karmiole Lecture in Archival Studies speaker. 

In 2014 "What We Talk About When We Talk About Original Order in Writers' Archives," an article based on her doctoral research won Archivaria's W. Kaye Lamb Prize that recognizes advancements in archival thinking. She won the award for a second time in 2020, along with co-authors  Alexandra Alisauskas and Devon Mordell, for the article "'Treat Them with the Reverence of Archivists': Records Work, Grief Work, and Relationship Work in the Archives."

Select publications

Articles

Chapters

References
 

1974 births
Living people
Canadian archivists
Female archivists
People from Mississauga
University of Toronto alumni
University of Victoria alumni